Martin Laamers (born 2 August 1967) is a Dutch former international footballer who played as a midfielder. Laamers played for professional clubs in the Netherlands and Belgium, making over 400 career appearances.

Career
Born in Arnhem, Laamers played for FC Wageningen, Vitesse, KRC Harelbeke and Gent.

Laamers made two appearances for the Netherlands between 1989 and 1990.

References

1967 births
Living people
Footballers from Arnhem
Dutch footballers
Netherlands international footballers
FC Wageningen players
SBV Vitesse players
K.R.C. Zuid-West-Vlaanderen players
K.A.A. Gent players
Eerste Divisie players
Eredivisie players
Belgian Pro League players
Association football midfielders
Dutch expatriate footballers
Dutch expatriate sportspeople in Belgium
Expatriate footballers in Belgium